The Yakovlev Yak-18T is a four- or five-seat fully aerobatic utility aircraft developed by Yakovlev. Introduced to train Aeroflot pilots, it has gained some popularity as a sportplane both inside and outside the former USSR. It is powered by a 268-298 kW (360-400 hp) Vedeneyev M14P radial engine, and is designed for stresses of +6.48/-3.24 g.

Design and development
All the Yak-18 and Yak-18T have in common is the model number. The Yak-18T is a unique design, despite its nomenclature.

The 18T was designed in the late 60's, as a civilian aircraft. The aircraft has a nosewheel, is a four- or five-seater, and has a nine-cylinder 360 hp radial.  The Yak-18T shares systems with the Yak-50/52 family. These aircraft all have the 265 kW (355 hp) Vedeneyev M14 nine-cylinder radial engine as well as the same underlying compressed-air system for engine starting, brakes, undercarriage and flaps. The propeller, avionics and other parts are also shared. The Yak-18T, like all Russian aircraft used for training, is aerobatic.

Compared with other four-seat light aircraft such as the Cessna 172 or the Piper PA-28, the Yak-18T is only a little wider and longer but it is much heavier and is equipped with a considerably more powerful engine.  The Yak-18T is perhaps better compared with the Piper Saratoga which has two extra seats but which has a similar maximum weight, together with a retractable undercarriage and a similarly powerful engine.  The Yak-18T is, however, distinguished by its strong construction, aerobatic capability and docile yet responsive handling characteristics.

The Yak-18T prototype had its first flight in mid-1967 and subsequently the type was placed in series production in Smolensk.

Operational history
The Yak-18T went on to become the standard basic trainer with Aeroflot flight schools, while small numbers also entered service with the Soviet Air Force as liaison and communications aircraft. After approximately 700 were built, many for Aeroflot, production ceased in the late 1980s, to be resumed in 1993. In 2011 it was claimed that the type remained in small-scale production by the Yakolev Design Bureau, although apparently none had been produced in more than a decade.

Technoavia has marketed the SM94, its own development of the Yak-18T, featuring curved windshield, larger fuel tanks and choice of avionics package, but production is dependent on orders being placed.

Operators

Cuban Air Force - Former operator.

Moldova Air Force - one aircraft in active service for basic training

Lithuanian National Defence Volunteer Forces

Aeroflot
Soviet Air Force

Armed Forces of Transnistria

Specifications (Yak-18T)

References

Further reading

External links

 Richard Goode Aerobatics - Yak-18T product page
 Pilot Magazine

Low-wing aircraft
Yak-018T
1970s Soviet civil trainer aircraft
1970s Soviet civil utility aircraft
Single-engined tractor aircraft
Aircraft first flown in 1967